Kayden Harrack (born 5 November 2003) is a professional footballer who plays as a centre-back for Queens Park Rangers youth academy. Born in England, he plays for the Grenada national team.

Club career
Harrack starting playing football with the youth academy of Brentford at the age of 8, and moved to Queens Park Rangers at the age of 13. He went on trial with Arsenal F.C. in the summer of 2020, and Fulham in the fall of 2020.

International career
Born in England, Harrack is of Grenadian descent. He was called up to represent the Grenada national team for a set of friendlies in March 2022. He debuted with Grenada in a 0–0 friendly tie with Gibraltar on 24 March 2022, coming on as a late sub in the 79th minute.

References

External links
 
 QPR Profile

2003 births
Living people
People with acquired Grenadian citizenship
Grenadian footballers
Grenada international footballers
English footballers
English sportspeople of Grenadian descent
Association football defenders
Queens Park Rangers F.C. players